Belinda Josephine Stowell  (born 28 May 1971 in Harare, Zimbabwe) is an Australian sailor and Olympic champion. She won a gold medal in the 470 Class with Jenny Armstrong at the 2000 Summer Olympics in Sydney.

In 2017, Stowell and Armstrong were inaugural inductees in the Australian Sailing Hall of Fame. She went on into coaching.

References

External links

1971 births
Living people
Australian female sailors (sport)
Sailors at the 2000 Summer Olympics – 470
Sailors at the 2004 Summer Olympics – 470
Sailors at the 2012 Summer Olympics – 470
Olympic sailors of Australia
Olympic gold medalists for Australia
Olympic medalists in sailing
Medalists at the 2000 Summer Olympics
Recipients of the Medal of the Order of Australia
21st-century Australian women